Psaphida rolandi, or Roland's sallow, is a moth of the family Noctuidae. The species was first described by Augustus Radcliffe Grote in 1874. It is found in North America from southern Ontario and Quebec, south to Florida.

The wingspan is about 34 mm. Adults are on wing from April to May.

The larvae feed on oak.

References

Moths of Maryland

Psaphida
Moths of North America
Moths described in 1874